Karel Maes, Latinized Carolus Masius (1559–1612) was bishop of Ypres and later bishop of Ghent in the Habsburg Netherlands.

Life
Maes was born in Brussels in 1559, the son of Jacobus Maes, a member of the Council of Brabant, and Aleyde de Tassis. He received holy orders and on 10 May 1590 was appointed dean of Antwerp Cathedral. He went on to become grand almoner to the Archdukes Albert and Isabella.

He was consecrated bishop of Ypres on 24 June 1607, in succession to Petrus Simons. This was the beginning of a period of peace (due to the ceasefire preceding the Twelve Years' Truce of 1609–1621) and of rebuilding after the devastations of the Dutch Revolt.

After Pieter Damant's death he was transferred to the diocese of Ghent, taking possession of the see on 5 November 1610. In 1611 he co-consecrated Johannes Malderus as bishop of Antwerp. His notable exertions to restore order to his diocese undermined his health, and he died in Ghent on 21 May 1612. Canon Antoine De Smet delivered his eulogy. His main legatee was Marguerite Maes, but he also left a number of relics to his cathedral. He was buried in the cathedral crypt. His monument was damaged in 1666, and a new one designed by Rombaut Pauwels was erected in the choir.

References

1559 births
1612 deaths
Clergy from Brussels
Roman Catholic bishops of Ypres
Bishops of Ghent
Clergy of the Spanish Netherlands